Ochiai Station (落合駅) is the name of two train stations in Japan:

 Ochiai Station (Hokkaido)
 Ochiai Station (Tokyo)